Mohammad Naeem Islam (born 31 December 1986) is a Bangladeshi international cricketer. He was born on 31 December 1986 in Gaibandha and is a right-handed batsman and occasional off break bowler.

Domestic career
He made his debut for Rajshahi Division in 2004/05 and played through the 2006/07 season, after having represented the full range of Bangladesh representative youth teams and went on to make his international debut on 9 October 2008 against New Zealand. He has scored seven centuries and 17 fifties in first-class cricket as of December 2011, with a best of 136 against Barisal Division.

He was the leading run-scorer for Legends of Rupganj in the 2017–18 Dhaka Premier Division Cricket League, with 720 runs in 16 matches. He was also the leading run-scorer for Rangpur Division in the 2018–19 National Cricket League, with 444 runs in six matches. He was also the leading run-scorer for North Zone in the 2018–19 Bangladesh Cricket League, with 522 runs in six matches.

International career
Following the exodus of 14 players to the Dhaka Warriors team of the unsanctioned Indian Cricket League, Bangladesh were forced to introduce new players. Naeem Islam was one of three uncapped players called into the Bangladesh squad for a series of three One Day Internationals (ODIs) against New Zealand in October 2008, shortly after the exodus. Chief selector Rafiqul Alam called Islam a "talented young batsman". He played in all three matches in the series, although his first innings was not until the second match when he was run out without facing a ball. Naeem top scored in the final match with an unbeaten 46 in Chittagong, although that was unable to prevent his side slumping to a 79-run loss.

That was followed by his inclusion in the Test squad to face New Zealand in Chittagong, where he made his Test debut, scoring 14 in the first innings and 19 in the second. On a turning track, he picked up his maiden Test wicket when he dismissed Daniel Flynn caught behind in New Zealand's first innings.

Naeem was part of the 13-man Bangladesh squad that played in the 2010 Asian Games in late November. They played Afghanistan in the final and won by five wickets, securing the country's first gold medal at the Asian Games. The Bangladesh Cricket Board founded the six-team Bangladesh Premier League in 2012, a twenty20 tournament to be held in February that year. An auction was held for teams to buy players, and Naeem was bought by the Sylhet Royals for $90,000.

References

External links

Living people
1986 births
Bangladeshi cricketers
Bangladesh Test cricketers
Bangladesh One Day International cricketers
Bangladesh Twenty20 International cricketers
Rangpur Division cricketers
Rajshahi Division cricketers
Sylhet Strikers cricketers
Asian Games gold medalists for Bangladesh
Asian Games medalists in cricket
Cricketers at the 2010 Asian Games
Cricketers at the 2011 Cricket World Cup
Comilla Victorians cricketers
Kala Bagan Krira Chakra cricketers
Legends of Rupganj cricketers
Mohammedan Sporting Club cricketers
Chattogram Challengers cricketers
Bangladesh North Zone cricketers
Rajshahi Royals cricketers
Bangladesh under-23 cricketers
Khulna Tigers cricketers
Medalists at the 2010 Asian Games
People from Gaibandha District